The Grupo Empresarial Antioqueño (GEA, Business Group of Antioquia) also known as Sindicato Antioqueño, is a Colombian conglomerate composed by around 125 companies, most of them based in Antioquia Department.

Though, legally speaking, such an entity does not exist, it is commonly regarded as the first Colombian keiretsu. It is "controlled" by four main companies: Bancolombia (banking), Grupo Argos (cement, power & infrastructure), Grupo Sura (insurance, financial), and Grupo Nutresa (processed food). The group, through these companies, has 10,000 shareholders. GEA's 2007 income amounts to 5.5% of Colombia's gross domestic product.

On 20230115 the Financial Times reported: 'Regulators are investigating whether the GEA is acting as an “economic group”.'

Companies

Bancolombia
Inversiones Nutresa
Nutresa
Compañía Nacional de Chocolates
Compañía Nacional De Chocolates de Perú S.A. 
Compañía de Galletas Noel
Compañía de Galletas Pozuelo D.C.R.
Industrias de Alimentos Zenú
Dulces de Colombia
Colcafé
Meals de Colombia
Pastas Doria
Rica Rondo
Frigorífico Suizo
La Bastilla
Hermo de Venezuela
Frigorífico Continental
Tecniagro
Comarrico
Fabricato
Inversiones Argos
Cementos Argos
Cementos Colón
Corp. Incem
Port Royal
CINA
Savannah Cement
Southern Star Concrete, Inc.
Concrete Express
Ready Mixed Concrete
Celsia
Grupo Sura
Seguros SURA formerly Compañía Suramericana de Seguros
Compañía Suramericana de Seguros de Vida
Interoceánica de Seguros
EPS SURA formerly Susalud
ARP SURA formerly Suratep
Seriauto
Administradora de Fondos de Inversión Suramericana
Gerencia Prestación servicios de Salud
IPS Punto de Salud, IPS Punto de Vista, AVANCE, Salud en Casa
Compañía Suramericana de Capitalización
Centro para los Trabajadores CPT
Interoceanica de seguros
Tipiel S.A.
Internacional Ejecutiva de Aviación

Former subsidiaries

Almacenes Éxito

References

Conglomerate companies of Colombia